Yakup Bugun (born 5 May 1987) is a Turkish professional footballer who currently plays as a goalkeeper for Keçiörengücü.

Life and career
Bugun was born in Sarıgöl, Manisa. He joined local club Sarıgölspor as a youth player and moved to Altınordu soon after, and made his professional debut on  7 October 2006. Trabzonspor transferred him in 2008, loaning him out to feeder club Trabzon Karadenizspor immediately. Bugun has also been loaned out to Altınordu and Alanyaspor.

References

External links

1987 births
Living people
Turkish footballers
Trabzonspor footballers
Altınordu F.K. players
1461 Trabzon footballers
Alanyaspor footballers
Denizlispor footballers
Association football goalkeepers